Yannick Filipović (born 23 February 1998) is a German footballer who plays as a centre-back for Bonner SC.

A youth product of Werder Bremen, Filipović moved to 1. FC Kaiserslautern II in 2017. After two seasons, in 2019 he joined Fortuna Köln. In 2020, Filipović joined FC Wegberg-Beeck, before moving to Bonner SC.

Early life 
Yannick Filipović was born in Mönchengladbach, Germany on 23 February 1998, to a Montenegrin father and a Peruvian mother. On 4 August 2016, Filipovic trained with the first team for the first time.

Club career 
In 2020, Filipović was signed by Wegberg-Beeck. At the beginning of 2020, he suffered a meniscus tear, missing the remaining 15 games of the season until the middle of the year. On 25 October 2020, he made his debut against Homberg, winning 1–0.

On 1 July 2021, Filipović joined Bonner SC on a free transfer.

International career 
Filipović holds three nationalities, making him eligible to represent Germany, Montenegro or Peru internationally. In 2021 he indicated that he wanted to play for the Peru national team, but pointed out that he has never had contact and does not have Peruvian citizenship.

Career statistics

Club

References

External links
 

1998 births
Living people
Sportspeople from Mönchengladbach
German footballers
Montenegrin footballers
German people of Montenegrin descent
German people of Peruvian descent
Montenegrin people of Peruvian descent
Association football central defenders
SV Werder Bremen players
1. FC Kaiserslautern II players
SC Fortuna Köln players
FC Wegberg-Beeck players
Bonner SC players
Regionalliga players